Andrewsae may refer to:

 Gogonasus, Gogonasus andrewsae, a Devonian fish and link to early tetrapods
 Mesodon andrewsae, a species of air-breathing land snail; see Mesodon
 ''Mesomphix andrewsae, a species of snail